The Sulawesi hornbill (Rhabdotorrhinus exarhatus), also known as the Sulawesi tarictic hornbill, Temminck's hornbill or Sulawesi dwarf hornbill, is a relatively small, approximately  long, black hornbill. The male has a yellow face and throat, and yellowish horn bill with black markings. The female has all-black plumage and a darker bill.

An Indonesian endemic, the Sulawesi hornbill is distributed in the tropical lowland, swamps and primary forests of Sulawesi and nearby islands, from sea level to altitude up to 1,100 metres. There are two subspecies of the Sulawesi hornbill. The nominate subspecies, P. e. exarhatus, occurs in north Sulawesi, and P. e. sanfordi is found in central, east and south Sulawesi, Buton and Muna Island.

The Sulawesi hornbill is a social species that lives in groups of up to 20 individuals. It is believed that only the dominant pair breeds, while the remaining members of the group act as helpers. The diet consists mainly of fruits, figs and insects. The female seals herself inside a tree hole to lay her eggs. During this time, the male and helpers provide food for the female and the young.

Widespread and common throughout its native range, the Sulawesi hornbill is evaluated as vulnerable on the IUCN Red List of Threatened Species.

This species is one of the tarictic hornbills that is doing better in zoos.  There are three collections currently breeding them: Whipsnade (England), Avifauna (the Netherlands) and San Diego (USA).  At Whipsnade the birds are kept in the bird garden area. At San Diego they have two pairs, one in the walk-through Parker Aviary and the other in a small nearby aviary.

References

External links 
 BirdLife Species Factsheet
 Kemp, A. C. (2001). Family Bucerotidae (Hornbills). pp. 436–523 in: del Hoyo, J., Elliott, A., & Sargatal, J. eds. (2001). Handbook of the Birds of the World. Vol. 6. Mousebirds to Hornbills. Lynx Edicions, Barcelona. 

Sulawesi hornbill
Endemic birds of Sulawesi
Sulawesi hornbill